Blexit may refer to:

 Blexit, a movement towards black economic independence by encouraging African-Americans to leave traditional financial systems perceived to have taken advantage of the black community.  Blexit was formed in Minnesota in 2016 as the product of community meetings after the police killing of Philando Castile in St. Paul. The term was coined by Me’Lea Connelly.
 BLEXIT Foundation, a social media campaign launched in 2018 by Candace Owens, and currently a 501(c)(3) non-profit organization dedicated to the advancement of urban and minority communities by encouraging youth to seek and take advantage of opportunities in the 21st-century United States.

References 

English words
American political neologisms